{{Infobox scientist
| name              = Marc J. Hetherington
| image             = Marc Hetherington 2011.jpg
| caption           = Hetherington in 2011
| birth_date        = 
| birth_place       = 
| birth_name        = 
| death_date        = 
| death_place       = 
| residence         = 
| citizenship       = 
| nationality       = American
| ethnicity         = 
| fields            = Political science, health care in the United States, participatory democracy
| workplaces        = Vanderbilt UniversityBowdoin CollegePrinceton UniversityUniversity of VirginiaUniversity of North Carolina at Chapel Hill
| alma_mater        = University of Pittsburgh (B.A.)  University of Texas at Austin (Ph.D.)
| doctoral_advisor  = 
| academic_advisors = 
| doctoral_students = 
| notable_students  = 
| known_for         = Why Trust Matters, Parties, Politics, and Public Policy in America, Authoritarianism and Polarization in American Politics,Why Washington Won't Work
| author_abbrev_bot = 
| author_abbrev_zoo = 
| influences        = 
| influenced        = 
| awards            = 
| signature         = 
}}

Marc Joseph Hetherington (born June 20, 1968) is an American political scientist. He is a professor of political science at The University of North Carolina at Chapel Hill.

 Biography 
Hetherington has taught at the University of Virginia, Princeton University, Bowdoin College, and Vanderbilt University. He received a bachelor degree from University of Pittsburgh and a PhD in Government from the University of Texas at Austin.

Hetherington is author of Why Trust Matters: Declining Political Trust and the Demise of American Liberalism and Parties, Politics, and Public Policy in America with William Keefe, and of Authoritarianism and Polarization in American Politics'' with Jonathan Weiler.

Hetherington is married to Suzanne Globetti, a political scientist at The University of North Carolina at Chapel Hill and currently resides in Chapel Hill.

References 

1968 births
Living people
University of Pittsburgh alumni
University of Texas at Austin College of Liberal Arts alumni
Vanderbilt University faculty
American political scientists
Voting theorists